The Roussillon Grand Prix (Grand Prix du Roussillon) was a Grand Prix motor racing event that was held between 1946 and 1949 in the streets of Perpignan, France. The race used the  Circuit des Patanes around the Square Bir Hakeim. In 1948, the grand prix was a part of the Formula 2 series. The Roussillon Grand Prix disappeared after four years, for safety reasons.

A motorbike race was also held in the circuit the same day between 1946 and 1952.

The 1–2 October 1994, an auto-moto historic Grand Prix was organised on the same street circuit. Maurice Trintignant, winner of the 1948 edition was present.

Winners of the Grand Prix du Roussillon

GPR: Grand Prix motor racing. F2: Formula Two.

Motorcycle Grand Prix

References

External links
Picture of the circuit
 Introduction to the Roussillon Grand Prix
 The 1949 Roussillon Grand Prix